Disks large-associated protein 5 (DAP-5) also known as discs large homolog 7 (DLG7) or hepatoma up-regulated protein (HURP) is a protein that in humans is encoded by the DLGAP5 gene.

DLG7 is a kinetochore protein that stabilizes microtubules in vicinity of chromosomes. DLG7 controls spindle dynamics, promotes interkinetochore tension and efficient kinetochore capture. DGL7 is a part of Ran-dependent complex. Stabilization of DGL7 in cell occurs due to phosphorylation by Aurora A kinase. Expression of DGL7 is found in cancer and stem cells.

References

Further reading

External links